627 may refer to:
the year 627, AD
the year 620s BC
the number 627 (number)
Prisoner 627, identification number for Captain John Price, a fictional character in the video game Call of Duty: Modern Warfare 2.
Experiment 627, a fictional character from the Lilo & Stitch franchise
Disodium guanylate E627 food additive